Fendall is a surname. Notable people with the surname include:

Fendall family, American political family descended from Josias Fendall, who immigrated to Maryland in the early 1650s
Fendall-Dent-Worthington family political line
John Fendall (disambiguation), several people by that name
Josias Fendall, Esq. (1628–1687), the 4th Proprietary Governor of Maryland
Philip Richard Fendall II (1794–1868), American lawyer and politician

See also
Lee-Fendall House, historic house located at 614 Oronoco St. in Alexandria, Virginia